Pseudonebularia indentata is a species of sea snail, a marine gastropod mollusk, in the family Mitridae, the miters or miter snails.

References

indentata
Gastropods described in 1874